Linda Andersen (died January 18, 2003) was the victim of premeditated murder by her two teenage daughters on January 18, 2003, in Mississauga, Ontario. Since both daughters were under the age of 18 at the time of the murder, their identities are protected under the Youth Criminal Justice Act, a Canadian law. The names Linda Anderson, as well as sisters Sandra and Elizabeth (Beth) Andersen, are aliases created by journalist Bob Mitchell, in an effort to protect the girl's identities in the book he wrote about their mother's murder. The book is The Class Project: How to Kill a Mother: The True Story of Canada's Infamous Bathtub Girls. The sisters are also commonly referred to as the "Bathtub Girls" due to them drowning their mother in a bathtub. 

The girls planned the murder with a few of their schoolmates, with the intention of making it look like an accident. On January 18, 2003, Linda Andersen drank as usual, but the daughters plied Tylenol 3 pills in her drinks, to slow her heart rate. When she got into the bathtub, one of the sisters held her head underwater until she stopped convulsing and twitching. They crafted an alibi that they were out with friends at a restaurant while their mom was at home preparing her bath. They called 9-1-1 when they got home at 10:30 p.m. and said that their mother had died in their absence. For almost a year, the death was considered accidental drowning secondary to alcohol intoxication. Andersen's three children received a total of around $200,000 in insurance money due to their mother's death. 

Eleven months after the murder, a young male came forward to the police, informing them that one of the sisters said that the girls drowned their mother. Thus, an investigation began that included testimony gained when the young man was wired for audio and video, assessment of text messages and internet searches on a computer they owned, and interviews of their friends. Sandra and Beth were arrested on January 21, 2004. In late 2005, they went to trial and were convicted of first degree murder. In June 2006, they were sentenced to 10 years, six years of incarceration and four years of community supervision, the maximum sentence for juveniles.

Background
Linda Andersen gave birth to three children in Mississauga, Ontario. Since both daughters were under the age of 18 at the time of the murder, the identities of the victim, her daughters and son are protected under the Youth Criminal Justice Act. The names Linda, Sandra, Elizabeth (Beth) and Bobby Andersen are aliases created by journalist Bob Mitchell for the victim, her oldest daughter, her other daughter, and her son. Her husband abandoned his family and Andersen supported the children as a single mother. She suffered from depression and a dependency on alcohol.

Andersen was married to a man who was convicted of drunk driving and in 2001 he was convicted of domestic abuse. After her second husband left, Andersen's drinking worsened and the girls took on more household responsibilities.

By 2002, her two teenage daughters resented the amount of money that their mother spent on alcohol and wished that they had some of the things that their friends had like "swimming pools and clothes", which they thought would make them more popular. Sandra described surviving childhood sexual abuse, which went unreported by a priest whom she confided in. She also said that her mother drove drunk and did not provide basic necessities for the family. Sandra said that she tried and failed to report the abuse to Children's Aid Society.

Because of their discontent, the sisters began to search on the Internet for ways to kill their mother. The teenagers believed that by killing their mother, they would be entitled to insurance money of $133,000. This compensation, the sisters resolved, would be spent on a trip with their friends to Europe and to purchase a house. The sisters decided to drown their mother because they believed it would be "fast and unspectacular". After formulating a murder plan, they informed three of their friends, who all encouraged the sisters. The friends remained steadfast in their support of the sisters and did not alert their parents, the police, or other authority figures about the crime.

Andersen, 43 or 44 years old at the time of her murder, was an Xray technologist who was unemployed by the time of her murder.

Murder
During lunch time on January 18, 2003, the sisters began giving their mother liquor in order to get her drunk. Their plan was to make Andersen fully inebriated so that she could not resist their attack. They also gave their mother six Tylenol 3 tablets (containing codeine) to slow down her heart.

The murder was intended to look like an accident.

Sandra and Beth filled the family bathtub with water and took Andersen to the bathroom. Andersen had difficulty getting into the bathtub, because of the mixture of vodka and pills she had been given. After putting gloves on, Sandra and Beth gave their mother a massage. Within minutes, according to police reports, Sandra instructed her mother to lie on her stomach so that she could scrub her back. Sandra instantly pushed her mother's head down and did not let go. After four minutes, Sandra released her mother's head and found Andersen to be dead. After having killed their mother, Sandra and Beth went with their friends to a nearby restaurant where they celebrated their victory and to create an alibi. When they met up with their friends, about 6:51 p.m., the girls communicated that they had killed their mother.

The girls returned to their home about 10:30 p.m. and called 9-1-1. They said that they left the house about 6:00 p.m., when their mother was drunk and about to take a bath.

The cause of death was determined to be accidental drowning secondary to alcohol intoxication. Analysis of the deceased's bodily fluids disclosed very high levels of alcohol (around 400 mgs%) and drugs, including codeine and acetaminophen. Dr. Robert Langville, a forensic toxicologist, testified that Anderson had five times the legal blood-alcohol level for driving in her system and three times the safe level of codeine in her blood when she died.

The girls lived with an aunt and their three-year-old brother lived with other family members. Manulife, an insurance company, paid out $67,000 to their brother and $133,674.90 to the two girls.

About eleven months after Andersen's death, one of the girls told a male friend that she and her sister committed their mother's drowning. He went to the police and told them that one of the defendants had confessed to him at a party that she and her sister had killed their mother. Following his report a car was provided to the young male friend, who was wired for audio and video by the police. He talked with the girls about the details of their murder of their mother over a one month period.

Arrest and trial
The defendants, who came to be known as the "bathtub girls", were arrested on January 21, 2004 and initially placed in separate youth correctional centers. They were later placed under house arrest. Both sisters made taped confessions of the crime, which were used as evidence in the trial. A computer was seized from the girl's residence and chat messages were found regarding the preparations, plans, and enactment of the murder. There were also searches for information about the effects of mixing alcohol and Tylenol-3 prior to the murder.

Sandra and Beth were tried beginning in November 2005 and found guilty of first degree murder. In June 2006, they were sentenced to 10 years in prison for first degree murder, the maximum youth sentence.  The 10 years consisted of six years in custody and four years under community supervision. If they had been tried as adults, they would have received life sentences. Although tried as youths, they were incarcerated in prisons for women. While the sisters were incarcerated they were unable to communicate with one another.

In his decision about the case, Justice Bruce Duncan stated that the girls grew up in a poor, depressing and degrading home atmosphere, even though their mother earned a good income. They were not able to empathize that their mother was absent a lot because she worked double shifts, was often exhausted, and drank to self-medicate.

Justice Bruce Duncan said in the conclusion of his decision:

The two defendants set out to commit the perfect crime but instead they created the perfect prosecution. The case against them is overwhelming. It is probably the strongest case I have ever seen in over thirty years of prosecuting, defending and judging criminal cases.

The Crown sought to collect the insurance money paid out to the girls, since they received money for having committed a crime. Only $48,487.04 remained in 2006. Whatever was recovered would be paid out to their brother.

A young man, Beth's boyfriend, was convicted for conspiring to murder her mother and covering up the crime, based upon chat logs between him and the sisters. He also provided about five Tylenol-3 pills for the murder. Found guilty in December 2006, he was originally sentenced to 18 months, but ultimately received eight months in prison followed by four months under supervision.

Aftermath
By receiving youth sentences, the goal is for children to be rehabilitated and have a chance at a normal life. The older sister, Sandra, was released to a halfway house in 2009, while the younger sister, Beth, was released a year later.

By 2020, it was reported that Sandra graduated from university and became a scientist, while Beth was married, became a mother, and graduated from law school. To pass the bar in Ontario, individuals are required to "be of good character". They are also required to report all criminal proceedings to the Law Society of Ontario, which could result in a hearing to determine if they meet ethical and professional standards. Liam O’Connor, a criminal defense lawyer, said in 2018 that he "might give a youthful killer a second chance" to become a lawyer, but not an adult murderer.

Popular culture 
In 2008, journalist Bob Mitchell wrote the book The Class Project: How to Kill a MotherThe True Story of Canada's Infamous Bathtub Girls.

Linda Andersen's murder case was broadcast on the Australian television series Deadly Women in 2010. A documentary of the murder was shown on the Dark Waters of Crime series on Viva Channel.

In 2014, the crime drama film Perfect Sisters, was based on the murder of Linda Andersen. In 2015, it was released in the UK under the name, "Deadly Sisters".

See also
Crime in Canada
List of drowning victims
Matricide

Notes

References

2003 murders in Canada
2003 in Ontario
January 2003 crimes
January 2003 events in Canada
History of Mississauga
Matricides
History of Brampton
Deaths by drowning
Deaths by person in Canada
Female murder victims